Liu Jian (born 20 August 1984) is a former Chinese footballer who played as a midfielder or deep-lying playmaker. He represented Qingdao Jonoon, Guangzhou Evergrande, Beijing Renhe and Qingdao. In his career he won four Chinese Super League titles, one Chinese FA Cup and a AFC Champions League, all while he was with Guangzhou. He also played for China national football team between 2007 and 2013 and secured over 30 caps.

Club career 
Liu Jian started his football career with Qingdao Jonoon in the 2004 season. He made his debut for the club on 19 September 2004 in a 1-1 draw against Sichuan Guancheng. He scored his first goal for the club on 4 December 2004 in 1-1 draw against Sichuan Guancheng. The following season, he immediately established himself as a regular for the club in the 2005 season, becoming an integral part due to his versatility. Liu would go on to captain his club and attracted the interests of reigning Chinese champions Guangzhou Evergrande, however with Qingdao Jonoon unwilling to allow their captain leave on a free transfer at the end of the 2013 Chinese Super League season, forged a contract extension. The club were found guilty for breaking the Chinese FA's rules and were deducted 7 points.

On 3 January 2014, Liu transferred to fellow Chinese Super League side Guangzhou Evergrande. After months of negotiation problems between Qingdao and Guangzhou, he was finally cleared to make his debut for the club on 19 April 2014 in a 2-1 win against Shanghai Shenhua. He would go on to win his first league title with the club at the end of the 2014 Chinese Super League season. This would be followed by him playing in and then going on to win the 2015 AFC Champions League. Going on to establish himself as a deep-lying playmaker within the team, he would win his fourth league title with the club at the end of the 2017 Chinese Super League season. 

After four seasons at Guangzhou, Liu moved to Chinese Super League newcomer Beijing Renhe on 28 December 2017. He would go on to make his debut in a league game on 3 March 2018 against Chongqing Dangdai Lifan in a 1-0 defeat. While he was part of the team that helped the club avoid relegation in his first season with the club, he wasn't able to achieve the same fate in the following season and they were relegated at the end of the 2019 Chinese Super League season. On 2 April 2021, Liu joined top tier club Qingdao on a free transfer. After one season with the club, Liu would retire from playing on 21 June 2022 and start to move into coaching.

International career
Liu made his debut and scored his first goal for the Chinese national team on 21 October 2007 in a 7-0 win against Myanmar.

Career statistics

Club statistics
.

International goals

Scores and results list China's goal tally first.

Honours

Club
Guangzhou Evergrande
Chinese Super League: 2014, 2015, 2016, 2017
AFC Champions League: 2015
Chinese FA Cup: 2016
Chinese FA Super Cup: 2016

Individual
Chinese Super League Team of the Year: 2007

References

External links 

 

1984 births
Living people
Sportspeople from Zibo
Chinese footballers
Footballers from Shandong
China international footballers
Qingdao Hainiu F.C. (1990) players
Guangzhou F.C. players
Beijing Renhe F.C. players
Chinese Super League players
Association football defenders 
Association football midfielders